Fidlar, stylized as FIDLAR, is an American punk and garage rock band from Los Angeles. The band's name is an acronym for Fuck It Dawg, Life's a Risk, a skate mantra gleaned from singer Zac Carper's former roommates. Originally, FIDLAR went under the name 'Fuck The Clock', as referenced in their song "Cheap Beer". To date, the band have released three studio albums: FIDLAR (2013), Too (2015) and Almost Free (2019). The band are mostly known for short, fast songs that deal with partying and narcotics. In 2013, Pitchfork wrote that the band "don't make music you'll grow old with, and they won't get an "A" for originality, but that's not really the point".

History 
Founding members Zac Carper and Elvis Kuehn met while working at a recording studio in which Carper was employed as an engineer and Kuehn was an intern. The two started recording songs when the studio was empty and posting the finished products online. Three years after recording their first songs, they stepped on stage together with the Black Lips and went on tour with the Hives.

In 2011, they released their debut EP, DIYDUI, produced by Lewis Pesacov. In 2012, FIDLAR were named one of Stereogum's 40 Best New Bands of 2012. In October 2012, the band made their television debut on Last Call with Carson Daly, where they performed "Whore" and "No Waves" from their then-upcoming album FIDLAR.

The band is currently signed to Mom + Pop Music in the US, Wichita Recordings in the UK and Dine Alone Records in Canada.

Personal lives and side projects 
Elvis Kuehn (guitar/vocals) and Max Kuehn (drums) are the sons of Greg Kuehn, keyboardist for Long Beach punk legends, T.S.O.L. while Zac Carper (vocals/guitar) is the son of famed surfboard designer John Carper. Zac struggled with drug addiction and spent time in rehab for it, inspiring the song "No Waves". Bassist Brandon Schwartzel was Carper's friend before joining the band, with the two bonding over drugs and homelessness. The four have been performing together as FIDLAR since 2009. Zac was born in Hawaii, while Elvis and Max are both from Los Angeles, and Schwartzel was born in San Diego.

As well as all being members of FIDLAR, each member of the band has side-projects they are in:

Carper has produced albums or helped co-write songs by such bands as Dune Rats, SWMRS, The Frights, Sweet Thing, The Goldberg Sisters, Dirty Sweet, and Tokyo Police Club. Schwartzel also periodically performs DJ sets at Monty's Bar under the pseudonym of "DJ Basil". Schwartzel & Max Kuehn are in a band with members of Together Pangea called Los Bolos. Max Kuehn has released solo compositions online, as well as being a member of The Squirmers The Diffs and the Head Hunters with his brother Elvis, The Small Wigs, and Kitten, with Carper prior to, and during their full time in FIDLAR.

Band members

 Zac Carper – lead vocals, guitar, keyboards (2009–present)
 Brandon Schwartzel – bass, backing vocals (2009–present)
 Max Kuehn – drums, percussion (2009–present)

Former members
 Elvis Kuehn – guitar, backing and lead vocals, keyboards (2009–2022)

Former touring musicians
 Danny Nogueiras – drums (2009–2010)
 Alice Baxley – bass (2010)
 Andy Miller – bass (2010–2011)
 Mikki Itzigsohn – bass (2009–2010)

Discography

Studio albums

Extended plays

Singles 
"No Waves / No Ass" (2012)
"Cheap Beer" (2012) (First released as cassette in 2011 with tracks "Chinese Weed" and "Carnivore Girls")
"Wait for the Man" (2012)
"Awkward" (2013) (First released as split with The Orwells - "Awkward / Always N Forever")
"40oz on Repeat" (2015)
"West Coast" (2015)
"Drone" (2015)
"Sabotage" (2016) (Beastie Boys cover)
"Alcohol" (2018)
"Are You High?" (2018)
"Too Real" (2018)
"Can't You See" (2018)
"By Myself" (2019)
"Flake" (2019)
"Xanny"/ "By Myself" (2020)  - Like a Version special 7" release in Australia for Record Store Day 2020, recorded at Triple J Studios.
"FSU" (2022)
"Sand On the Beach" (2022)
"Taste the Money" (2022)
"Centipede" (2023)

Music videos

Appearance in media
The band also played on Jimmy Kimmel Live! in 2015, where they performed "West Coast" and "Why Generation" from their second album Too. The band was also featured on Conan, in 2016, where they performed "West Coast”"

 "No Waves" appeared in the video games Saints Row IV and The Crew and also in Netflix series "Love".
 "White on White" was featured in the video game Sunset Overdrive.
 "Cheap Beer" was featured in the film Neighbors, the TV show iZombie and in Plan B's skateboarding film "True" during Pat Duffy's part.
 "Cocaine" was featured in the TV show Finding Carter and video game Grand Theft Auto V.
 "5 to 9" is played in the 16th episode of the fourth season of The Vampire Diaries
 "Wait For the Man" and "Oh" appeared on an episode of Shameless (US).
 "Cheap Beer" and "No Waves" both appeared on the soundtrack to The Crew.
 "Punks" appeared in the "Embrace Your Dark Side" promo for the fourth season of Arrow.
 "Drone" appeared on the soundtrack to the video game WWE 2K17.
 The band's cover version of the song "Red Right Hand" featured in the opening episode of series 4 of the BBC series Peaky Blinders.
 The band's cover of the Nirvana track "Frances Farmer Will Have Her Revenge On Seattle" was released on the Mom+Pop-exclusive Record Store Day 2018 3xLP compilation 10 Years of Mom+Pop.
 "Flake" appeared in the 11th episode of the third season of Thirteen Reasons Why
 "Flake" appeared in the 1st episode of Locke & Key
 "Breaker" appeared on the soundtrack to the 2020 film Bill & Ted Face the Music
 "West Coast" appeared on the soundtrack to the 2020 video game Tony Hawk's Pro Skater 1+2

Awards 
 2013: O Music Awards, Best Web-Born Artist
 2013: Association of Independent Music, AIM Independent Music Awards, Best Live Act

References

External links 

 
 FIDLAR at Mom + Pop Music
 FIDLAR at Wichita Recordings
 FIDLAR at Dine Alone Records

Musical groups established in 2009
Musical groups from Los Angeles
Musical quartets
Garage punk groups
Skate punk groups
Rock music groups from California
Wichita Recordings artists
Sibling musical groups
2009 establishments in California
Dine Alone Records artists
Mom + Pop Music artists